Warren Julius Ajax (May 12, 1921 – December 19, 2004) was an American professional basketball player. He played in the National Basketball League for the Minneapolis Lakers during the 1947–48 season and averaged 0.3 points per game.

References

External links 

 Espn.com Profile
 Basketball Stats

1921 births
2004 deaths
American men's basketball players
Basketball players from Minneapolis
Centers (basketball)
Forwards (basketball)
Minneapolis Lakers players
Minnesota Golden Gophers men's basketball players
American military personnel of World War II